Ethan Bronner (born 1954) is a senior editor at Bloomberg News following 17 years at The New York Times, most recently as deputy national editor.

Biography
Bronner is a graduate of Wesleyan University's College of Letters and the Columbia University Graduate School of Journalism. He began his journalistic career at Reuters in 1980, reporting from London, Madrid, Brussels and Jerusalem. From 1985 until 1997, he worked for The Boston Globe. He started as a general assignment and urban affairs reporter. He went on to be the paper's Supreme Court and legal affairs correspondent in Washington, D.C. and then its Middle East correspondent, based in Jerusalem.

He then accepted a position with The New York Times, where he was the paper's national education correspondent from 1997 to 1999 and its education editor from 1999 to 2001. In 2001, he transferred to the paper's investigative unit which focused on the September 11 attacks. A series of articles on al Qaeda that Bronner helped edit during that time was awarded the 2001 Pulitzer Prize for explanatory journalism. He then served as assistant editorial page editor and in 2004, he became its deputy foreign editor. From 2008 to 2012 he was The Times Jerusalem bureau chief. In 2010, Electronic Intifada publicly revealed that Bronner's son was serving in the IDF as Bronner was covering the Israeli–Palestinian conflict, raising questions of bias and conflict of interest in his work. The paper's public editor recommended he be reassigned for the duration of his son's service. The paper's executive editor rejected the recommendation and expressed full faith in Bronner's work. He rotated out of Jerusalem in 2012 and spent a year as the NYT's national legal reporter, then became its deputy national editor. In 2015, he accepted a position as senior editor at Bloomberg News where he edits and writes investigative and analytic articles dealing mostly with international affairs.

Bronner is the author of Battle for Justice: How the Bork Nomination Shook America (Norton, 1989), which was chosen by The New York Public Library as one of the 25 best books of 1989.

Personal
Bronner and his wife Naomi Kehati, an Israeli-born psychologist, live near New York. They have two sons, Eli and Gabriel. His son served in the Israel Defense Forces.

Bibliography
 Battle for Justice: How the Bork Nomination Shook America. New York: W.W. Norton & Co., 1989.

References

External links
 Archived articles at The New York Times
 Archived articles at Bloomberg
 
 
 
 

The New York Times editors
The New York Times writers
American investigative journalists
Jewish American journalists
Living people
1954 births
Columbia University Graduate School of Journalism alumni
Wesleyan University alumni
The Boston Globe people
20th-century American journalists
American male journalists
21st-century American Jews